"Teen-Age Crush" is a song written by Audrey Allison and Joe Allison and performed by Tommy Sands.  It reached #2 on the U.S. pop chart and #10 on the U.S. R&B chart in 1957.

The song ranked #33 on Billboard's Year-End top 50 singles of 1957.

Other versions
Barry Frank released a version of the song as a single in 1957, but like his other covers of popular hits of the day released by Bell Records, then a budget label, it did not chart.
Gary Paxton released a version of the song as a single in 1962, but it did not chart.
Ray Whitley released a version of the song as a single in 1963, but it did not chart.

References

Songs about teenagers
1957 songs
1957 singles
1962 singles
1963 singles
Songs written by Joe Allison
Capitol Records singles
Liberty Records singles
Vee-Jay Records singles